Utøy or Utøya is a village area in the municipality of Inderøy in Trøndelag county, Norway. The village sits about half way between the village of Vangshylla (to the southwest) and the village of Sakshaug (to the northeast). The "Utøy area" generally includes the area around the village which is the southern part of the Inderøya peninsula.

Economy

The predominant employment in for the Utøy area is agriculture, as in the rest of Inderøy, in addition to functioning as a suburb of Steinkjer, Verdal, and Levanger.  There is no notable industry, but the area has a Coop Marked grocery store, Utøy School, kindergarten, and amateur theatre.

At nearby Vangshylla there is a hotel that specializes in fishing tourism in the fjord, a boat harbor, and also located there is the Skarnsund Bridge that when it opened in 1991 was the longest cable-stayed bridge in the world and connects the Mosvik area to Innherred.

Notable residents
Notable people from Utøy include Willy Ustad, a novelist; Ole Richter, Norwegian Prime Minister in Stockholm, and actress Ingrid Bolsø Berdal.

References

Inderøy
Villages in Trøndelag